Phigalia titea, the spiny looper or half-wing moth, is a species of moth in the family Geometridae. The species was first described by Pieter Cramer in 1780 (some sources give 1782). The average wingspan is about 34 mm.

References

Moths of North America
Moths described in 1780
Taxa named by Pieter Cramer